South Korea participated in the 2009 Asian Indoor Games in Hanoi, Vietnam on 30 October – 8 November 2009.

Medal summary

Medal table

Medalists

Korea, South
2009
Asian Indoor Games